Within France, there are three main types of baccalauréat degrees:
the baccalauréat général (general baccalaureate);
the baccalauréat professionnel (professional baccalaureate);
the baccalauréat technologique (technological baccalaureate).

The baccalauréat technologique (technological baccalaureate) currently has eight sections. It is obtained in a Lycée technologique at the age of 18. The teaching of the lessons is based on inductive reasoning and experimentation. It allows you to work or to pursue short and technical studies.

There's important choice in the variety of specialities such as laboratory science, hotel management, or marketing management.

History
Technological baccalaureates were created in 1968 and are grouped into three sets:

Series F:
F1: Mechanical Engineering,
F2: Electronics,
F3: Electrical,
F4: Civil Engineering,
F5: Physics
F6: Chemistry laboratory
F7: Biological Sciences (Biochemistry option)
F7: Biological Sciences (Biology option)
F8: medical and social sciences,
F9: Energy Equipment,
F10: Microtechnology (to be recut in F10A: Micro Devices option and F10B: Micro-optics option);

F11: Techniques of music;
F11: Techniques of dance;
F12: Applied Arts (1980).

Series G:
G1: Business Administration,
G2: quantitative management techniques,
G3: Commercial Techniques.

Series H: Computer Techniques.

The 1992 reform put in place the following series:

Industrial Science and Technology (ITS);
Science and Technology Laboratory (STL);
Tertiary science and technology (STT);
Medical Social Sciences (SMS).
Hospitality (removing the old patent BT technician and implementation of BTNH more general and versatile built around the various activities of the hotel world namely the applied management, culinary arts, tableware and service and reception / floors and accommodation).

After the renovation of the sector STT (STG in 2005 and MGT in 2012) and SMS (ST2S in 2007), it is the Industrial Science and Technology in 2011, which is split into two new sets industry: science and technology design and applied arts (STD2A) and science and technology industry and sustainable development (STI2D).

The 8 current sections

See also

Baccalauréat
Education in France
 International Baccalaureate
 European Baccalaureate

References

School examinations
Secondary school qualifications
Education in France